Something Good is the debut full-length studio album by the singer songwriter Catherine Porter. Recorded  at Battery Studios, Westside Studios & Fort Studios, all in London, the album is mostly composed by Catherine with producer Kevin Melpass, though it also includes several cover versions.  It was Catherine's only full-length release before leaving Jive Records, unhappy with the direction they were trying to push her in.

Crazy had been Catherine's entry into the 2000 Song for Europe competition in the United Kingdom - which she lost to Nikki French. Talkin' To The Fish is her 9/11 song, and tells the story of a doomed employee in the World Trade Center wishing anything to swap places with the hapless fish in the office tank, just to escape the knowledge of what was about to happen to them.

One single was released from the album - She's So Cool.  Neither the single or the album were promoted, and despite strong interest from BBC Radio 2, both failed to chart.

Track listing
All tracks written by Catherine Porter and Kevin Malpass except where noted

 "She's So Cool" 
 "At Seventeen" (Janis Ian)
 "Talkin' to the Fish"
 "Some of Your Lovin'" (Gerald Goffin/Carole King)
 "Something Good"
 "It Ain't Rocket Science"
 "I've Got You"
 "Crazy" (Catherine Porter/Tony Moore)
 "I'll See You When I See You"
 "Essex Road"
 "I'm Not Needed Here Now" David Gates/Billy Dean
 "Winds of Change"

Personnel 
 Vocals: Catherine Porter
 Keyboards: James Pearson
 Bass: Norman Watt-Roy
 Drums: Dylan Howe
 Guitars: John Themis
 Cello: Tony Peace
 Oboe: John Anderson
 Saxophone, Flute: Snake Davis
 Trombone: Neil Sidwell
 Strings: Gavin Wright
 Produced by Kevin Malpass
 Recorded and mixed by Simon Smart

2002 albums
Catherine Porter albums